United Nations Security Council resolution 1248, adopted without a vote on 25 June 1999, after examining the application of the Republic of Kiribati for membership in the United Nations, the Council recommended to the General Assembly that Kiribati be admitted, bringing total membership of the United Nations to 186.

See also
 Enlargement of the United Nations
 Member states of the United Nations
 List of United Nations Security Council Resolutions 1201 to 1300 (1998–2000)

References

External links
 
Text of the Resolution at undocs.org

 1248
 1248
 1248
1999 in Kiribati
June 1999 events